Kuwait participated in the 2007 Asian Winter Games held in Changchun, China from January 28, 2007 to February 4, 2007.

References

Nations at the 2007 Asian Winter Games
Asian Winter Games
Kuwait at the Asian Winter Games